The El Salvador women's national football team is governed by the Salvadoran Football Federation.

Results and fixtures

The following is a list of match results in the last 12 months, as well as any future matches that have been scheduled.

Legend

2022

Coaching staff

Current coaching staff
As of 1 September 2021

Manager history
  Julio César Ramos (2006–2008)
  José Ricardo Herrera (2010–2011)
  José de la Cruz Flores Barahona (2012–2013)
  Giovanni Trigueros (2014)
  José Ricardo Herrera (2015–2016)
  Elmer Guidos (2018)
  Debbie Gómez (2019 -November 2019)
  Eric Acuña (November 2020–Present)

Players

Current squad
The following players composed the roster for the match against Aruba on 19 February 2022.

Recent call-ups
The following players were called up to the squad in the last 12 months.

Competitive record

FIFA Women's World Cup

*Draws include knockout matches decided on penalty kicks.

Olympic Games

*Draws include knockout matches decided on penalty kicks.

CONCACAF Women's Championship

*Draws include knockout matches decided on penalty kicks.

Pan American Games

*Draws include knockout matches decided on penalty kicks.

Central American and Caribbean Games

*Draws include knockout matches decided on penalty kicks.

Central American Games

*Draws include knockout matches decided on penalty kicks.

References

External links
Official website
FIFA profile

 
Central American women's national association football teams